The Pine Grove Hills are a mountain range in  Lyon County, Nevada. The highest point in the range is the summit of Bald Mountain at 9,549 ft (2,911 m).

References

External links
Bald Mountain (Lyon County), Pine Grove Hills, 9462 ft, (coordinates)

Mountain ranges of Nevada
Mountain ranges of the Great Basin
Mountain ranges of Lyon County, Nevada